Ahn Na-kyung (born 10 October 1989) is a South Korean anchor. She is the current co-anchor for JTBC flagship newscast JTBC Newsroom.

Biography 
Ahn joined JTBC in 2014 as an announcer. During her final interview, Sohn Suk-hee asked her what she'll do if she fails the announcer exam, of which she answered: "I'll find ways to work here, even if it means becoming a janitress." Two months after, she became an interim anchor for JTBC News Morning& when Hwang Nam-hee went on maternity leave. She would then become the host for JTBC Newsroom's sports segment until becoming the new sub-anchor for its weekend edition in 2015, succeeding Lee Ji-eun. Soon after, she became the new sub-anchor for its weekday edition on 18 April 2016, succeeding Han Yoon-ji and becoming the longest-serving female anchor in the newscast's history.

Ahn has also done special appearances in JTBC variety shows Hidden Singer and Knowing Bros, as well as a guest appearance in Abnormal Summit.

Career

News

Variety

References

External links 

 Korean Wikipedia article page
 JTBC reporter information

South Korean announcers
South Korean television presenters
South Korean women television presenters
1989 births
South Korean journalists
South Korean women journalists
Living people
JTBC people